Bizau is a town in the Bregenz Forest in the Austrian state of Vorarlberg, part of the district Bregenz. The municipality has around 1080 inhabitants.

Population

Cultural places of interest 
The Parish Church Hl. Valentin was built in 1472. 

The Wetzsteinhöhle ("Whetstone Cave") is a manmade dry cavity, a former mine for sandstone. The Hüttbach stream flows down below the cave.

In 2007, the municipality of Bizau declared a wooden fence ("Steackohag") a protected monument. The fence commemorates the traditional "Alpgasse", on which the cattle were transported to and from the mountain pastures (see Alpine Transhumance), while also symbolizing the handicraft traditions and the virtues of hard work for which the region is known.

Bizau is part of the Bregenzerwald Umgang (literally "Bregenzerwald Walking Tour"). This walking tour offers insights into the architecture and community planning of 12 traditional villages in the Bregenzerwald. While walking over various landscapes, visiting public buildings, homes and everyday objects, walkers gain a comprehensive overview of typical Bregenzerwald architectural styles as they developed throughout the ages.

References

External links
http://www.bizau.at
https://www.bregenzerwald.at/thema/architektur/umgang-bregenzerwald/

Cities and towns in Bregenz District